Raoul Last (born 31 May 2000) is a Dutch footballer who plays as a left-back for Meerssen.

Career
Last played in the youth of MVV Maastricht, Genk and again MVV. In 2014, while at Genk, he was capped for the Netherlands national under-15 team. In the 2018–19 season, he was in the first team of MVV for a few games, but made his debut the following season. His debut took place on 26 August 2019, in the 0–1 away match against Jong PSV. Last came on for Joshua Holtby in the 92nd minute. On 29 January 2020, Last signed a contract with MVV, which would keep him at the club until 30 June 2021.

Career statistics

Club

Notes

References

2000 births
Living people
Dutch footballers
Dutch expatriate footballers
Association football defenders
MVV Maastricht players
K.R.C. Genk players
SV Meerssen players
Eerste Divisie players
Dutch expatriate sportspeople in Belgium
Expatriate footballers in Belgium
Netherlands youth international footballers
Footballers from Maastricht